The fictional superhero team Fantastic Four featured in Marvel Comics publication has appeared in four live-action films since its inception. The plots deal with four main characters, known formally as Reed Richards, Susan Storm, Ben Grimm and Johnny Storm, and how they adapt to the superpowers they attain.

Constantin Film bought the film rights for the characters in 1986. A low-budget film was produced in 1992 by New Horizon Studios owned by Roger Corman. In 2004, after Constantin sub-licensed the film rights to 20th Century Fox, a second Fantastic Four film entered production. Fantastic Four was released in 2005 and the sequel Fantastic Four: Rise of the Silver Surfer was released in 2007. Both films received mixed to negative reviews from critics, yet earned a combined  worldwide at the box office. Due to 20th Century Fox's disappointment with the box-office return of Fantastic Four: Rise of the Silver Surfer, a potential third Fantastic Four film and a Silver Surfer spin-off film were canceled.

A reboot of the series, Fantastic Four, directed by Josh Trank, was released in 2015 and received largely negative reviews from both critics and audiences, as well as from Trank himself and became a box office bomb. A sequel was scheduled to be released in 2017, but was canceled.

In March 2019, Marvel Studios regained the film rights to the Fantastic Four and associated characters, along with The X-Men and Deadpool, after The Walt Disney Company acquired 21st Century Fox. A new film featuring the team, part of Phase Six of the Marvel Cinematic Universe, is currently in development for a scheduled release on February 14, 2025.

After the acquisition, the 20th Century Fox-produced Fantastic Four films were rebranded as "Marvel Legacy" films on Disney+ alongside the studio's X-Men films, thus separating them from MCU titles produced by Marvel Studios.

Films

The Fantastic Four (1994, unreleased)

The plot follows four astronauts on an experimental spacecraft who are bombarded with a comet's cosmic rays, whereby they acquire extraordinary abilities.

Bernd Eichinger of Constantin Film acquired the film rights of the Fantastic Four from Marvel Comics in 1986. In order to maintain the rights, Eichinger hired Roger Corman in 1992 to produce a low-budget film. The 1994 adaptation The Fantastic Four had its trailer released to theaters, while the cast and director went on a promotional tour; however the film was never officially released. Some accused the film of being an ashcan copy, made only to retain the license. Stan Lee and Eichinger stated that the actors had no idea of the situation, instead believing they were creating a proper release. Marvel Comics paid in exchange for the film's negative, so 20th Century Fox could go ahead with the big-budget adaptation. While released neither to theaters nor home-video, bootleg copies did surface.

Tim Story films (2005–2007)

Fantastic Four (2005)

The story features Reed Richards, Ben Grimm, Susan Storm, Johnny Storm and Victor Von Doom getting hit by a space storm after boarding a space station. As a result of the radiation from the storm, they gain new abilities and powers that they have deal with in their own ways.

Chris Columbus was hired by 20th Century Fox to write and direct the film in 1995. In 1997, Peter Segal was attached to a script which had been written by Columbus and Michael France. Segal later left the project in the same year. Phillip Morton worked on the script, and Sam Hamm did rewrites in 1998. The following year, Raja Gosnell signed on as director. The film was announced in August 2000 as being aimed for a July 4, 2001 release date. Gosnell decided to leave the project to film Scooby-Doo. Peyton Reed served as replacement in April 2001. Reed contemplated making the film as a period piece set in the early 1960s during the space race. He later dropped out from the film. In April 2004, Tim Story was hired to direct and principal photography began in August in Vancouver, British Columbia, Canada with re-shoots carried on until May 2005. Starring Ioan Gruffudd, Jessica Alba, Chris Evans, Michael Chiklis and Julian McMahon, the film was released on July 8, 2005.

Fantastic Four: Rise of the Silver Surfer (2007)

The story, both inspired by Stan Lee and Jack Kirby's Fantastic Four comic-book storyline "The Galactus Trilogy" and Warren Ellis's comic-book Ultimate Extinction, features the Silver Surfer, whose cosmic energy has been affecting the planet Earth and leaving craters around the planet. Set against an impending wedding between Reed and Susan, the U.S. Army recruits the Fantastic Four to help stop the Silver Surfer, and separately gain help from Doom.

With Fantastic Four grossing $333.5 million worldwide, 20th Century Fox hired director Tim Story and screenwriter Mark Frost in December 2005 to return to work for the sequel. Don Payne was also hired to write the screenplay. Principal photography began on August 28, 2006 in Vancouver, British Columbia, Canada. The film was released on June 15, 2007.

Due to 20th Century Fox's disappointment in the box-office performance of the film, a potential third Fantastic Four film and a Silver Surfer spin-off film were cancelled.

Fantastic Four (2015)

The story, loosely based on the Ultimate Fantastic Four comic-books, features four people teleporting to an alternate universe, which alters their physical form and grants them new abilities. They must learn to harness their abilities and work together as a team to save the Earth from a familiar enemy.

In August 2009, the development for the reboot of the Fantastic Four film franchise was announced by 20th Century Fox. In July 2012, Josh Trank was hired to direct. Michael Green, Jeremy Slater, Seth Grahame-Smith and Simon Kinberg were hired to write the screenplay with Slater and Kinberg receiving credit. Casting began in January 2014 with the announcement of the cast occurred in the following months. Principal photography began in May 2014 in Baton Rouge, Louisiana and ended in August the same year. Starring Miles Teller, Kate Mara, Michael B. Jordan, Jamie Bell and Toby Kebbell, the film was released on August 7, 2015. The film was a box office bomb, and received negative reviews, and is often considered to be the one of the worst films ever made. A sequel was originally planned for 2017, but was removed from the studio's schedule in November 2015. This is also the last Fantastic Four film produced by Fox before 20th Century Fox was sold to Disney and the rights reverted to Marvel Studios.

Marvel Cinematic Universe (2022–present)

Doctor Strange in the Multiverse of Madness (2022) 

An alternate version of Reed Richards appeared in the Marvel Cinematic Universe (MCU) film Doctor Strange in the Multiverse of Madness (2022), played by actor John Krasinski, a popular fancasting choice for the character. This version of the character, originating from Earth-838, is both a founding member of his reality's Fantastic Four team, as well as a council member on the Illuminati alongside other superpowered individuals, who observe and apprehend potential threats to the wider Multiverse. He is initially present at the trial of the displaced Stephen Strange from "Earth-616" (Benedict Cumberbatch), whom he warns for potentially causing an incursion as his reality's Strange did. However before he and his colleagues could decide on Strange's consequences, they would be confronted by the corrupted Wanda Maximoff / Scarlet Witch from 616-Strange's reality, who possessed a body of her own variant to infiltrate their headquarters. In spite of Richards' attempts to reason with Wanda without resorting to physical conflict, he is killed alongside most of his associates. Additionally, the Earth-838 Christine Palmer is mentioned to be a member of the Baxter Foundation as a Multiverse analyst and researcher.

Prior to the film's release, Disney and Marvel Studios had attempted to retain secrecy surrounding both the inclusion of Mister Fantastic and Krasinski's involvement in the film. However, his appearance in the film alongside the other then-unrevealed Illuminati members would be leaked just prior to the film's wide release on May 6, 2022, through the circulation of footage and pictures depicting his character.

Future

The Walt Disney Company agreed to a $52.4 billion deal to acquire 21st Century Fox in December 2017, including its subsidiary 20th Century Fox. Disney's CEO Bob Iger stated that they plan to integrate the Fantastic Four into the Marvel Cinematic Universe (MCU), alongside the X-Men and Deadpool. The $71.3 billion deal was officially completed in March 2019. At the 2019 Marvel Studios San Diego Comic-Con Hall H presentation in July, studio head Kevin Feige announced that a Fantastic Four film, which will be set in the MCU, is in development. In December 2020, Feige announced that Jon Watts will direct the film; Watts previously helmed the Spider-Man films set in the MCU. In April 2022, Watts stepped down as director to take a break from directing superhero films. Later in July, Feige said that the reboot will not have an origin story. In August, Matt Shakman was in early talks to direct the film, which was confirmed in September during the Disney event D23. The same month, Jeff Kaplan and Ian Springer were announced to be writers for the film. Principal photography is scheduled to begin in early 2024. Elements from Fantastic Four Vol 1 16 and Fantastic Four Vol 1 19 are adapted in Ant-Man and the Wasp: Quantumania (2023).

Fantastic Four is scheduled to be released in the United States on February 14, 2025, as part of Phase Six of the MCU.

Cast and characters

Crew

Home media
20th Century Fox Home Entertainment released Fantastic Four (2005), Fantastic Four: Rise of the Silver Surfer and Fantastic Four (2015) on DVD, Blu-ray and digital download. The films were also released on DVD and Blu-ray box sets:

Reception

Box office performance

The Fantastic Four film series has grossed over $342 million in North America and over $803 million worldwide.

Critical and public response

Reception for all Fantastic Four films have been generally negative by critics. Scott Weinberg of eFilmCritic called the 1994 film "[a] painfully silly film, one with more heroic intentions than actual assets".

Rene Rodriguez of The Miami Herald gave negative reviews to the Fantastic Four films directed by Tim Story. Regarding Rise of the Silver Surfer, he said that the "story does the same sort of efficient, impersonal job he did on the first film, keeping things at such a basic, almost childish level that it seems the movie is aimed squarely, if not exclusively, at the 12-and-under set". However, Roger Moore of Orlando Sentinel gave Story's Fantastic Four films good reviews. He called the first film as a "popcorn popper" and a "cinematic sugar buzz" and the second film an "entertaining film that doesn't overstay its welcome".

The 2015 Fantastic Four film was the weakest reviewed of the series; it was criticised for its dark, humorless tone, its character arcs, designs (especially that of Dr. Doom), bland acting, and poorly written story. Director Josh Trank was himself not satisfied, posting a message on Twitter stating he had envisioned a better version of the film, but it was ruined by Fox; he later deleted the message.

Cancelled films

Doctor Doom
At San Diego Comic-Con International 2017, Noah Hawley said that he was developing a film centered on Doctor Doom. Dan Stevens was also said to be involved with the film. In June 2018, Hawley stated that the script was almost finished, but that there was "a little uncertainty" about whether it would be filmed due to his upcoming film Pale Blue Dot and the fact that Disney plans to acquire Fox. In March 2019, Hawley revealed that he was still unsure about whether he would be continuing the project, as it had not been officially greenlit, but that he had spoken to Kevin Feige about it. That August, Hawley told Deadline that the movie "is done", implying that he was no longer working on it.

Silver Surfer
In February 2018, a Silver Surfer film was in development with Brian K. Vaughan attached to the script.

Untitled Fantastic Four sequel
Before Fantastic Four began filming, 20th Century Fox announced plans for a sequel with a scheduled release date of July 14, 2017. Fox then rescheduled the release for June 2, 2017, with War for the Planet of the Apes taking its place on the July 14, 2017, slot. It changed the release date again to June 9, 2017, to be two weeks after Star Wars: The Last Jedi initial scheduled release date of May 26, 2017. Due to Fantastic Four poor box office performance of and negative reviews, Pamela McClintock of The Hollywood Reporter said that it "throws into question whether Fox will move ahead with a sequel". In November 2015, the sequel was removed from Fox's release schedule. When asked by Collider whether they would make another Fantastic Four film, Kinberg stated: "I have no idea. I think the truth is we would not do another Fantastic Four movie until it was ready to be made. One of the lessons we learned on that movie is we want to make sure to get it 100% right, because we will not get another chance with the fans".

Concept artist Alexander Lozano revealed that Trank's iteration of the Fantastic Four were considered for cameo appearances in Tim Miller's take on Deadpool 2.

Notes

References

20th Century Studios franchises
Action film series
 
Marvel Entertainment franchises
Science fiction film series